In quantum physics, the "monogamy" of quantum entanglement refers to the fundamental property that it cannot be freely shared between arbitrarily many parties.

In order for two qubits A and B to be maximally entangled, they must not be entangled with any third qubit C whatsoever. Even if A and B are not maximally entangled, the degree of entanglement between them constrains the degree to which either can be entangled with C. In full generality, for  qubits , monogamy is characterized by the Coffman-Kundu-Wootters (CKW) inequality, which states that

Monogamy, which is closely related to the no-cloning property, is purely a feature of quantum correlations, and has no classical analogue. Supposing that two classical random variables X and Y are correlated, we can copy, or "clone," X to create arbitrarily many random variables that all share precisely the same correlation with Y. If we let X and Y be entangled quantum states instead, then X cannot be cloned, and this sort of "polygamous" outcome is impossible.

The monogamy of entanglement has broad implications for applications of quantum mechanics ranging from black hole physics to quantum cryptography, where it plays a pivotal role in the security of quantum key distribution.

Proof 

The monogamy of bipartite entanglement was established for tripartite systems in terms of concurrence by Coffman, Kundu, and Wootters in 2000. In 2006, Osborne and Verstraete extended this result to the multipartite case, proving the CKW inequality.

Example 

For the sake of illustration, consider the three-qubit state  consisting of qubits A, B, and C. Suppose that A and B form a (maximally entangled) EPR pair. We will show that:

for some valid quantum state . By the definition of entanglement, this implies that C must be completely disentangled from A and B.

It follows that:

for some  such that . We can rewrite the states of A and B in terms of diagonal basis vectors  and :

Being maximally entangled, A and B collapse to one of the two states  or  when measured in the diagonal basis. We can rewrite our expression for  accordingly:

This shows that the original state can be written as a product of a pure state in AB and a pure state in C, which means that the EPR state in qubits A and B is not entangled with the qubit C.

References

Quantum information science